Bañuela or La Bañuela, also known as La Mójina, is the highest peak of the Sierra Morena, Spain.

Description
The mountain is 1,332 m high and it is located in a range known as Sierra de Navalmanzano, part of the Sierra Madrona range, at the southern end of Ciudad Real Province, Castile-La Mancha. It is mostly covered with matorral scrubland where plants such as Cistus, Erica and rosemary predominate.

There is a good hiking route to reach the peak starting from Fuencaliente, but there is no marked path to reach the peak after reaching a certain height. This makes it difficult to find the summit in misty weather. There is a triangulation pillar on the crest, but it is not exactly at the highest point, which is located nearby.

See also
Geography of Spain
Geology of the Iberian Peninsula
Sierra Morena

References

External links 
Sierra Madrona, paraiso en Sierra Morena

Geography of the Province of Ciudad Real
Sierra Morena
Mountains of Castilla–La Mancha